Sing My Song (season 2) was broadcast on CCTV-3 from January 2, 2015 to March 13, 2015, presented by Negmat Rahman (Episodes 1 - 6) and Li Jiaming (李佳明) (Episodes 7 - End). Tanya Chua, Liu Huan and Wakin Chau returned as tutors. Yu Quan replaced Yang Kun, who left after just one season. The winner was Hanggai (杭盖乐队) of Liu Huan team and Su Yunying (苏运莹) of Tanya Chua team was the runner-up.

Tutors and Finalists

The blind audition

The blind audition
A special rule is added from this season, each tutor has 3 chances to press the "straight access" button. If a contestant is chosen by that button of any tutor and they also choose that tutor, they can pass directly the selection round after and become 1 of 8 contestants of that tutor on the composer round.

Episode 1 (January 2)
Episode 1 on CCTV's official YouTube channel

Episode 2 (January 9)
Episode 2 on CCTV's official YouTube channel

Episode 3 (January 16)
Episode 3 on CCTV's official YouTube channel

Episode 4 (January 23)
Episode 4 on CCTV's official YouTube channel

Episode 5 (January 30)
Episode 5 on CCTV's official YouTube channel

Episode 6 (February 6)
Episode 6 on CCTV's official YouTube channel

The second time of selection

This part was broadcast at the end of episode 6. Each tutor must choose 8 best performances between their 14 choices after the blind audition (exclude the performances was chosen by "straight access" button). 8 contestant groups, who are chosen by tuteur, advance in the composer round and their music products will be certainly in their tutor album.

The composer and the battle stage

8 contestant groups, their tutor and mentor stay together for 24 hours (for Liu Huan team) or 12 hours (for other teams), in a large place of a hotel, divided into many rooms like 4 composer rooms (A, B, C, D), 1 tutor room, 1 room for lunch (or diner). Each contestant group must compose a new song follow the tutor subject during that time, include the eating time, each 2 groups are in 1 room (decided by lucky drawing).

Someone, who finish their new song, can perform it in front of their tutor and mentor, and then go home. 5 best new songs (4 winners of each room and 1 in the rest) chosen by their tutor can perform in the battle stage.

On each day of the battle stage, the 51 media juries have given a score by live votes (1 vote = 1 point) for each song after each contestant performance. After 5 performances of that day, the 3 others team tutors, each could give 5 points for only one contestant they wanted. The two contestants, the first who won the highest score and the second was selected by their team tutor, have represented their team to perform on the final stage.

Episode 7 (February 13) - Liu Huan team - "Follow Heart" (随心)
Episode 7 on CCTV's official YouTube channel

The composer round

Subject : Last year (去年)
Guest appearance as team captain : Henry Huo (霍尊) (Winner of Liu Huan team at Sing My Song (season 1))

The battle stage

Special performance of Liu Huan : Well water flower (井水花) - Zhao Ke (赵可) (1 of 14 song chosen by Liu Huan in the blind audition round)

Episode 8 (February 20) - Wakin Chau team - "Fantasy Amusement Park" (奇幻遊樂園)
Episode 8 on CCTV's official YouTube channel

The composer round

Subject : Reunion (团圆)
Guest appearance as team captain : Jiang Yaojia (蒋瑶嘉) (Top 8 of Wakin Chau team at Sing My Song (season 1))

The battle stage

Special performance of Wakin Chau : Don't polite (不客氣) - Su Qing (苏晴) (1 of 14 song chosen by Wakin Chau in the blind audition round)

Episode 9 (February 27) - Tanya Chua team - "The Universe's Heart" (心宇宙)
Episode 9 on CCTV's official YouTube channel

The composer round

Subject : The most unforgettable day (最难忘的一天)
Guest appearance as team captain : Zhou San (周三) (Top 8 of Tanya Chua team at Sing My Song (season 1))

The battle stage

Special performance of Tanya Chua : Time lapse (时光谣) - Wang Fanrui (王梵瑞) (1 of 14 song chosen by Tanya Chua in the blind audition round)

Episode 10 (March 6) - Yu Quan team - "Colour" (颜色)
Episode 10 on CCTV's official YouTube channel

The composer round

Subject : Colour (颜色)
Guest appearance as team captain : Wang Xiaotian (王晓天) (Top 8 of Yang Kun team at Sing My Song (season 1))

The battle stage

Special performance of Yu Quan : Small gift (小礼物) - Wang Jian (王健) (1 of 14 song chosen by Yu Quan in the blind audition round)

The Final - Episode 11 (March 13)
Episode 11 on CCTV's official YouTube channel

Tutor special performance

Final stage

At the first round, 8 performances divided into 2 turns, 4 each. Each contestant can choose the best of their 2 songs in the previous rounds to perform with their tutor or their tutor guest. After each turn, the song that won the highest live vote by audience would be advanced to final round.

At the final round, the 2 songs was voted publicly by 101 media juries. The song that won the highest vote would take the title "Best Chinese Song of the Year", that contestant would become the winner and take the final cup of Sing My Song.

Top 10 Songs of Sing My Song (season 2)

Top 10 songs was synthesized on internet by votes of the media and the spectators. Each winner receive a blue trophy symbolized the G-clef in music.

Ratings

2015 in Chinese music
2015 Chinese television seasons